Lewis Mill Complex is a historic grist mill complex located at Jefferson, Frederick County, Maryland. The complex consists of seven standing structures, a house foundation, and the remains of an earlier millrace. It centers on an early 19th-century three-story brick mill structure with a gabled roof. The mill complex served German immigrant farmers in Middletown Valley between 1810 and the 1920s. It was rehabilitated in 1979-1980 for use as a pottery shop. Also in the complex are a stuccoed log house and log springhouse built about; a frame wagon shed and corn crib structure and frame barn dating from the late 19th century; and early 20th century cattle shelter and a frame garage.

It was listed on the National Register of Historic Places in 1982.

A trombe wall was installed on the south wall of the mill in 1980 to heat the business and living quarters. Solar panels were installed on outbuildings in 2011.  Two businesses are located in the mill:  NutriCycle Systems and Catoctin Pottery.

References

External links
, including undated photo at Maryland Historical Trust

Buildings and structures in Frederick County, Maryland
German-American culture in Maryland
Grinding mills in Maryland
National Register of Historic Places in Frederick County, Maryland
Grinding mills on the National Register of Historic Places in Maryland